Parisolabiinae is a subfamily of earwigs, and contains two genera. The genus was cited by Srivastava in Fauna of India Pt. 2, and by Steinmann in his book, The Animal Kingdom.

References

External links 
 The Earwig Research Centre's Parisolabiinae database Source for references: type Parisolabiinae in the "subfamily" field and click "search".

Anisolabididae
Dermaptera subfamilies